is the second released single by the J-pop group NYC.

Track listing

Charts

2010 singles
J-pop songs
2010 songs
Song articles with missing songwriters